Tekal de Venegas Municipality (In the Yucatec Maya Language: “place of imprisonment” combined with the surname of a Spanish soldier who kept the city from destruction during the Caste War of Yucatán) is one of the 106 municipalities in the Mexican state of Yucatán containing  (95.80 km2) of land and located roughly 80 km east of the city of Mérida.

History
During pre-Hispanic times, the area was part of the chieftainship of  Ah-Kin-Chel. After the conquest the area became part of the encomienda system with Diego Brizeño as the encomendero in 1576. Subsequent holders of the trusteeship were María de Mena y Ontivero, who in 1698 had charge of 208 Indians and García Rejón, who was in charge of 965 Indians in 1756.

Yucatán declared its independence from the Spanish Crown in 1821 and in 1825, the area was assigned to the Coast region with its headquarters in the Izamal Municipality. In 1930, it became part of the Temax Municipality, before becoming head of its own municipality.

Governance
The municipal president is elected for a three year term. The town council has four councilpersons, who serve as Secretary and councilors of Public works, sports, ecology and public monuments.

The Municipal Council administers the business of the municipality. It is responsible for budgeting and expenditures and producing all required reports for all branches of the municipal administration. Annually it determines educational standards for schools.

The Police Commissioners ensure public order and safety. They are tasked with enforcing regulations, distributing materials and administering rulings of general compliance issued by the council.

Communities
The head of the municipality is Tekal de Venegas, Yucatán. The other populated areas are El Ancla, Chahchac, Kuncheilá, Monil, Oxozua, San Felipe, Hacienda Santa Cruz, Thohobkú, Tixcancal, and Xpichi. The significant populations are shown below:

Local Festivals
Every year from 28 to 31 January is held a celebration in honor of the Virgin of Candelaria and from 15 to 19 April a festival honors Saint Peter.

Tourist Attractions
 Church of San Román 
 Church of Saint Peter
 Hacienda Tohopkú

References

Municipalities of Yucatán